Ernest Alfred Cecil Roberts (20 April 1912 – 28 August 1994) was a Labour Party politician. He worked for the Amalgamated Union of Engineering Workers, was a co-founder of the Anti-Nazi League in 1977 and was the MP for Hackney North and Stoke Newington from 1979 to 1987.

Early life
Roberts left primary school in Shrewsbury at the age of thirteen, having declined a scholarship to the Shrewsbury School of Art, to work in a coal mine to help support ultimately ten siblings. He worked as an engineering worker for many years, much blacklisted and dismissed for trade union activities, until he became Assistant General Secretary of the Amalgamated Union of Engineering Workers in 1957. Ideologically, he was on the left-wing of the Labour Party.

Political career
After unsuccessfully contesting Stockport South in 1955 United Kingdom general election, Roberts was elected as the Member of Parliament for the Inner London constituency of Hackney North and Stoke Newington aged 67, according to his obituary writer Frank Allaun the oldest new MP since the Second World War, (although John McQuade who also took his only Westminster seat at the same election was eight months older than Roberts). He served from the 1979 general election until the 1987 general election, when he was deselected in favour of Diane Abbott who would go on to become the first-ever Black British female MP.

Family
He married Joyce Longley in 1953, and had a son and two daughters.

Books
 Workers' Control (Allen & Unwin 1973)
 労働者支配制 (Workers' Control Japanese edition) (1975)
 Unemployment – The Facts (Part-author) (Spokesman Books)
 Humanising the Work-place (Part-author) (Crook & Helm)
 The solution is Workers Control (pamphlet) (Spokesman Books)
 Democracy in the Engineering Union (Part-author) (IWC)
 Strike Back (Autobiography, with forewords by Tony Benn and Arthur Scargill) (posthumously published 1994)

References

External links 
 

1912 births
1994 deaths
Amalgamated Engineering Union-sponsored MPs
Labour Party (UK) MPs for English constituencies
UK MPs 1979–1983
UK MPs 1983–1987
Hackney Members of Parliament
English trade unionists
Politicians from Shrewsbury